UFC Fight Night: Machida vs. Anders (also known as UFC Fight Night 125) was a mixed martial arts event produced by the Ultimate Fighting Championship held on February 3, 2018, at Arena Guilherme Paraense in Belém, Brazil.

Background
While the UFC has hosted several events in Northeast Brazil, the event marked the promotion's first visit to Pará in the country's North region.

A middleweight bout between former UFC Light Heavyweight Champion Lyoto Machida and Eryk Anders headlined this event.

Luis Henrique was scheduled to face Timothy Johnson at the event. However, Henrique was removed from the pairing in early December and was replaced by Marcelo Golm.

At the weigh-ins Michel Prazeres weighed in at 161 pounds, 5 pounds over the lightweight non title fight upper limit of 156 pounds. As a result, the bout proceeded at catchweight and Prazeres was fined 20% of his purse which went to his opponent Desmond Green. Pedro Munhoz also missed weight, 4 pounds over the bantamweight non title fight upper limit of 136 pounds. In turn, his bout against former UFC Flyweight Championship challenger and The Ultimate Fighter: Team Bisping vs. Team Miller bantamweight winner John Dodson was pulled from the card after Dodson declined to take the fight. Meanwhile, Prazeres was supposed to weigh a maximum of 173 pounds on the night of the event for the fight to proceed as scheduled, but according to Green's camp, Prazeres weighed in at 180 pounds. Despite that, Green still accepted the fight and Prazeres gave him 40% of his purse.

Results

Bonus awards
The following fighters were awarded $50,000 bonuses:
 Fight of the Night: Thiago Santos vs. Anthony Smith
 Performance of the Night: Valentina Shevchenko and Iuri Alcântara

See also
 List of UFC events
 List of current UFC fighters
 2018 in UFC

References

UFC Fight Night
2018 in mixed martial arts
Mixed martial arts in Brazil
Sport in Belém
February 2018 sports events in South America